Virginia K. Heath (born 1959) is a UK-based New Zealand film director and academic; she is a professor of film at Sheffield Hallam University. In 2002 she won the John O'Shea Film Award for the best New Zealand short film by a New Zealand director residing abroad.

Biography 
Heath was born in Havelock North, in the North Island of New Zealand. She studied film at Saint Martin's School of Art in London, England, in 1985 and 1986. She began her film career directing a series of international arts documentaries for the Channel 4 Television series ‘Rear Window’.

Heath was commissioned by the United Kingdom Human Trafficking Centre to create a film to highlight the issue of human trafficking. She carried out interviews with exploited girls and women, and frontline agency workers, and created the film My Dangerous Loverboy. A website and social media channels were later added to aid increased engagement with the film, and the overall project won a cross media award from the National Film Board of Canada and was nominated for a Royal Television Society Award. The film is extensively used in schools and youth centres, and with frontline agency workers across the United Kingdom.

Heath was also commissioned by Creative Scotland and the BBC to create a film for the Glasgow 2014 Commonwealth Games. The resulting film, From Scotland with Love, combined film with live music created by King Creosote and was nominated for a BAFTA Scotland award.

Filmography

References

Living people
New Zealand expatriates in England
New Zealand film directors
New Zealand women film directors
Academics of Sheffield Hallam University
1959 births
People from Havelock North
Alumni of Saint Martin's School of Art